Asociación Civil Club Deportivo Mineros de Guayana, known as Mineros de Guayana or simply Mineros, is a professional football club based in Puerto Ordaz, Venezuela.

History
The Colegio Loyola Gumilla's field, located in Puerto Ordaz, was used in football matches. The people who played at the field decided to found a football club. On November 11, 1981, the club was founded as Club Deportivo Mineros de Guayana.

On November 20, 1981, the club's foundation constitutive act was signed.

On January 3, 1982, the club played its first match, against Villa Colombia FC, a Guayana's amateur club. Mineros won 2-0, both goals scored by José Pacheco.

On September 5, 1982, the club won the Segunda División Venezolana, being promoted to the following year's first division.

In 1989, the club won the first Primera División Venezolana.

Crest and colours
The club's logo is composed of a geometrical figure, which is a carbon diamond crystal zoomed millions of times with a microscope. The club's colors are blue and black.

Stadium
Mineros plays their home matches at CTE Cachamay, which has a maximum capacity of 41,600 people.  It was 1 of the 9 venues of the Copa America 2007, for this, US$160,000 were invested for the expansion of the stadium. The stadium has multiple uses, like a special kids area, an indoor gym, basketball and volleyball courts, a racing track, ten media station booths, a commercial center, movie theaters and three enormous parking lots. The stadium is surrounded by the river Caroní and the waterfall of the Cachamay Park.

Players

Current squad

Former managers
 Mario Kempes (Feb 10, 1997–Feb 23, 1998)
 Armando Londoño
 César Maturana
 César Farías (Oct 2005–07)
 Álvaro Gómez (June 15, 2007–Dec 24, 2007)
 Stalin Rivas (Dec 27, 2007–April 14, 2008)
 Alí Cañas (March 17, 2008–Sept 23, 2008)
 Del Valle Rojas (Sept 24, 2008–March 6, 2009)
 José Hernández (March 12, 2009 – March 1, 2010)
  Carlos Maldonado (July 4, 2010–Nov 20, 2012)
 Richard Páez (Nov 28, 2012–Jan 18, 2014)

Honours
Primera División Venezolana
Winners (1): 1989

Segunda División Venezolana
Winners (1): 1982

Copa de Venezuela
Winners (3):'' 1984, 2011, 2017

South American recordCopa Libertadores: 4 appearances1990: Group stage
1997: Group stage
2005: Preliminary round
2008: First stageCopa Sudamericana: 4 appearances2005: Preliminary round
2006: Preliminary round
2012: Second stage
2013: TBDCopa CONMEBOL: 1 appearance'''
1995: Quarter-finals

References

External links
 Official website
 Soccerway.com

 
Association football clubs established in 1981
Mineros de Guayana
Ciudad Guayana
1981 establishments in Venezuela